(The) Afterparty or After Party may refer to:

 A party that takes place after another party

Film and TV
 The Afterparty (TV series), a 2022 American murder mystery comedy television series
 The After Party (film), 2018
 The After Party: The Last Party 3, a 2011 documentary feature film
 "The After Party", a 2005 episode of 8 Simple Rules

Games
 Afterparty (video game), a 2019 video game

Music

Albums
 The After Party (album), a 2014 album by Ghost Town
 Afterparty (album), a 2008 album by Cool Kids of Death
 The Afterparty (album) 1996 album by Captain Hollywood Project
 After Party (album), a 2016 album by Adore Delano

Songs
 "After Party" (song), a 2020 song by Don Toliver
 "After Party", a song by Desiigner from the EP L.O.D., 2018
 "After Party", a 2013 song by Dorrough
 "Afterparty", a 2007 song by Freezepop from the album Future Future Future Perfect
 "Afterparty", a 2016 song by Balance and Composure from the album Light We Made

See also
 Party (disambiguation)